Mickey Mouse Disco is an album released by Disneyland Records in 1979. A late entry in the genre of disco, Mickey Mouse Disco included disco versions of Disney songs and Disney-fied versions of disco hits. The album was re-released on CD in 1995, and is currently available for download from iTunes. On April 13, 2019, the original LP was reissued for the annual Record Store Day.

Chart performance
The album peaked at number 35 on Billboards Pop Albums Chart and was certified 2× Platinum by the RIAA.

Track listing

Arrangement
Arrangement is done by Dennis Burnside (except "It's a Small World").

Side one
 "Disco Mickey Mouse" – 4:00
 "Welcome to Rio" – 3:23
 "The Greatest Band" – 4:10
 "Zip-a-Dee-Doo-Dah" – 2:13

Side two
 "Macho Duck" – 4:36
 "Mousetrap" – 2:56
 "Watch Out for Goofy!" – 3:30
 "It's a Small World" – 2:28
 "Chim Chim Cher-ee" – 2:10

Personnel
 Dennis Burnside – keyboards (track 6)
 Rick Daller – trumpet (track 6)
 Don Jackson – saxophone (track 6)
 Terry Mead – trumpet (track 6)
 Rex Peer – trombone (track 6)
 Clarence "Ducky" Nash - voice of Donald Duck

Certifications

Film

A short film based on the album, a music video clip show of classic Disney cartoons comprising five of the nine songs featured was released theatrically on June 25, 1980, alongside the feature The Last Flight of Noah's Ark.

The clips featured in the short were Thru the Mirror (1936), Clock Cleaners (1937), Mr. Duck Steps Out (1940), Mickey's Birthday Party and Symphony Hour (both 1942), the first appearance of Panchito Pistoles from The Three Caballeros (1944), Mickey's Delayed Date (1947) and How to Dance (1953). It was also included in episodes of various Disney cartoon compilation shows, such as Mickey's Mouse Tracks, The Ink & Paint Club and Donald's Quack Attack.

Legacy
"Disco Mickey Mouse" has appeared on more Disney compilation albums like Hallmark Celebrates 75 Years With Mickey  and Walt Disney Records Archive Collection, Vol.1 

D23 celebrated the album's 40th anniversary with a roller disco party.

A sample of the discofied version of "It's a Small World" can be heard on Fatboy Slim's 1999 recording "Praise You".

See also
 Disco Duck
 "Macho Man" (song)
 Walt Disney Records
 Disco music

References

External links
 Mickey Mouse Disco on IMDb
 Official YouTube playlist
 The 1980 film on YouTube

1979 albums
Disneyland Records albums
Disco albums
1980 films
1980 animated films